Poczekajka may refer to:

Poczekajka, Gmina Ruda-Huta, a village in Chełm County, Lublin Voivodeship, Poland
Poczekajka, Gmina Żmudź, a village in Chełm County